The 1996–97 CBA season was the second season of the Chinese Basketball Association.

The season ran from November 27, 1996, to March 30, 1997.

The Shanghai Sharks and Sichuan Pandas were promoted from the Second Division.

Regular season standings
These are the final standings for the 1996-97 CBA regular season.

Playoffs 
The top 8 teams in the regular season advanced to the playoffs.

In the Final series, the Bayi Rockets defeated the Liaoning Hunters (2-0) for the CBA championship.

Relegations
The bottom 4 teams played the relegation phase by round-robin.

The Ji'nan Army Zhejiang Squirrels were slated to be relegated to the Second Division.

CBA Awards
These are the award winners for the 1996-97 CBA regular season.

CBA Most Valuable Player: Hu Weidong (Jiangsu Dragons)
Best Techniques Award: Gong Xiaobin (Shandong Flaming Bulls)
Sportsmanship Award: Liu Yudong (Bayi Rockets)

All-Star Weekend
The 1997 CBA All-Star Game was played on April 5, 1997, in Shanghai.

The South All-Stars defeated the North All-Stars 98-84. Hu Weidong from the Jiangsu Dragons was named MVP of the All-Star Game.

James Hodges from the Liaoning Hunters won the Slam Dunk Contest, and Saulius Štombergas from the Shanghai Sharks won the Three-Point Shootout.

See also
 Chinese Basketball Association

References

 
Chinese Basketball Association seasons
League
CBA